Chukwuma Michael Umeoji  is a Nigerian Politician and current member, Federal House of Representatives representing Aguata Federal Constituency Anambra State in the 9th National Assembly.

Umeoji was the All Progressives Grand Alliance (APGA) flag bearer in the gubernatorial elections taking place on 6 November 2021. After Umeoji's selection as candidate for governor, a party committee disqualified him from the primary election on grounds of "defiance and insubordination to the party authority" and "doubtful financial status". He appealed the disqualification, unsuccessfully. A week before the November 6th election, Charles Soludo was confirmed the APGA candidate. In response, Umeoji joined rival party All Progressives Congress (APC).

Personal life 
He graduated from the University of Nigeria, Nsykka with a BA in Philosophy in 1992. He obtained a Master's in Philosophy from Nnamdi Azikiwe University.

References

Anambra State politicians
Living people
Place of birth missing (living people)
All Progressives Grand Alliance politicians
1967 births